Hancock Prospecting Pty Ltd is a leading Australian owned mining and agricultural business run by Executive Chairman Gina Rinehart and CEO Garry Korte. At stages of its trading, the company has been known as Hancock Prospecting Ltd, Hancock Resources Ltd, Hanwright Pty Ltd, Hancock & Wright Ltd, and Hancock Prospecting Pty Ltd.

Hancock Prospecting Pty Ltd is owned by Rinehart (76.6%) and the Hope Margaret Hancock Trust (23.4%).

The company was founded in 1955 by Rinehart's father, the late Lang Hancock. Hancock Prospecting holds the mineral rights to some of the largest Crown land leases in the Pilbara region of Western Australia.

Upon assuming the Executive Chairmanship, Rinehart took over a company that was in a perilous financial position with significant debt and major assets mortgages and under threat of seizure.

Activities
The Hancock Group of Companies holds numerous iron ore leases in the Pilbara. The leases cover an area of  predominantly in the Central Pilbara region and contain mineable reserves of Brockman and Marra Mamba ore of over 850 million tonnes. Leases in the Eastern Pilbara region contain mineable reserves of Marra Mamba ore of over 2 billion tonnes, and over 500 million tonnes of ferruginous manganese in their Nicholas Downs Project, which is a joint venture with mining services company Mineral Resources.

In 2011, the company was estimated to be earning about A$870 million in revenue per year. This is based on a 50% share of profits generated at the Hope Downs mine which is operated by Rio Tinto. Hope Downs production levels of 30 million tonnes per year and current prices (around US$140 per tonne) generate over A$2 billion in revenue, and about A$700 million in net cash. In addition, the company receives a 1.25% royalty from iron ore sales by Hamersley Iron (a Rio Tinto subsidiary) which delivers about A$170 million a year.

Hancock Prospecting exploration activities are done under the Jacaranda Alliance, a joint venture between Hancock, Minerals Australia Pty Ltd, and several former executives of Rio Tinto. Exploration and evaluation work on uranium, molybdenum, lead, zinc, gold, diamonds and petroleum deposits are conducted in Australia, Papua New Guinea, New Zealand and South East Asia.

As of 2016, Hancock Prospecting began to diversify its interests into the cattle industry, acquiring 67% of S. Kidman & Co.

Hancock Prospecting significantly funds the Institute of Public Affairs (IPA), paying the IPA $2.3 million in financial year 2016 and $2.2 million in financial year 2017, which represents one-third to a half of the IPA's total revenue in those years. These payments were not disclosed in IPA annual reports, and Rinehart's daughter Bianca Hope Hayward submitted in court that the Hancock Prospecting payments were credited to Rinehart in an individual capacity. Gina Rinehart was made a life member of the IPA in November 2016.

Attitudes towards indigenous peoples
Perhaps the most well known controversy in the history of the company centres around the racist views of founder Lang Hancock towards Indigenous Australians. Hancock is quoted as saying,
"Mining in Australia occupies less than one-fifth of one percent of the total surface of our continent and yet it supports 14 million people. Nothing should be sacred from mining whether it's your ground, my ground, the blackfellow's ground or anybody else's. So the question of Aboriginal land rights and things of this nature shouldn’t exist."

In a 1984 television interview, Hancock suggested forcing unemployed indigenous Australians − specifically "the ones that are no good to themselves and who can't accept things, the half-castes" − to collect their welfare cheques from a central location. And when they had gravitated there, I would dope the water up so that they were sterile and would breed themselves out in the future, and that would solve the problem."

Executive Chairman of Hancock Prospecting, Gina Rinehart, caused controversy in 2022, when she failed to apologise for or denounce comments made by her late father in the 1984 television interview. Hancock Prospecting subsequently withdrew an 15 million sponsorship from Netball Australia after Indigenous netballer Donnell Wallam voiced concerns about the deal and the impact of the comments, pertaining to a genocide, by "poisoning" and "sterilising" Indigenous Australians to "solve the problem"; as well as concerns about the company's environmental record.

Hope Margaret Hancock Trust

In 1988 Lang Hancock established the Hope Margaret Hancock Trust, nominating Rinehart as trustee, with his four grandchildren named as beneficiaries. The Trust owns a quarter of the shares in Hancock Prospecting. In 2011 Rinehart's daughter, Hope Rinehart Welker, commenced a commercial action in the New South Wales Supreme Court for reasons understood to be related to the conduct of the trustee. The action sought to remove Rinehart as sole trustee. Her brother, John, and sister, Bianca, were later revealed as parties to the dispute.

In an agreement reached between the parties, the Court granted an interim non-publication order in September 2011. In making the interim order, Justice Paul Brereton stated: "This is not the first occasion of discord in the family, which has immense wealth, no small part of which resides in the trust. In the past, the affairs of the family, including such discord, has attracted considerable publicity in the media." Then, in a judgement handed down on 7 October 2011, Justice Brereton stated that he intended to dismiss an application by Rinehart, that there be a stay on court action, and that the family be directed into mediation. In December 2011, three justices of the NSW Court of Appeal lifted the suppression orders on the case. However, a stay was granted until 3 February 2012 and extended by the High Court of Australia until 9 March 2012. Rinehart's application for suppression was supported by Ginia Rinehart (Gina Rinehart's daughter), but was opposed by Hope, John and Bianca. A subsequent application by Rinehart for a non-publication order on the grounds of fear of personal and family safety was dismissed by the NSW Supreme Court on 2 February 2012. In March 2012, when the suppression order was lifted, it was revealed that Rinehart had delayed the vesting date of the trust, which had prompted the court action by her three older children.

Rinehart stood down as trustee during the hearing in October 2013. While Rinehart's lawyers subsequently declared any legal matters closed, John and Bianca's legal representatives proceeded with a trial in the NSW Supreme Court to deal with allegations of misconduct, whereby Rinehart was accused of having "unclean hands".  it appeared likely that the matter would be settled by the court appointing a new trustee.

Projects
Balfour Downs Station Manganese Operation, northeast of Newman, a joint venture with Mineral Resources
Hope Downs mine, northwest of Newman, a joint venture with Rio Tinto
Roy Hill project, south of Port Hedland, a joint venture between Hancock Prospecting (70%), Marubeni (15%), POSCO (12.5%), and China Steel Corporation (2.5%) 
Alpha Coal project, Galilee Basin in Central Queensland
Kevin's Corner coal project, Galilee Basin in Central Queensland
Nicholas Downs mine, northwest of Newman, a joint venture with Mineral Resources Limited

See also

 Pilbara historical timeline

References

Mining companies of Australia
Companies based in Perth, Western Australia
Pilbara
Non-renewable resource companies established in 1955
Iron ore mining companies of Australia
Lang Hancock family
Family-owned companies of Australia
1955 establishments in Australia
Iron ore mining in Western Australia